The 1942 Massachusetts State Aggies football team represented Massachusetts State College in the 1942 college football season. The team was coached by Walter Hargesheimer and played its home games at Alumni Field in Amherst, Massachusetts. The 1942 season was the team's last before disbanding during World War II. Mass State finished the season with a record of 2–5.

Schedule

References

Massachusetts State
UMass Minutemen football seasons
Massachusetts State Aggies football